Louis I may refer to:

 Louis the Pious, Louis I of France, "the Pious" (778–840), king of France and Holy Roman Emperor
 Louis I, Landgrave of Thuringia (ruled 1123–1140)
 Ludwig I, Count of Württemberg (c. 1098–1158)
 Louis I of Blois (1172–1205)
 Louis VIII of France who claimed the throne of England as Louis I of England, (1216–1217)
 Louis I Wittelsbach, Duke of Bavaria (1173–1231)
 Louis I, Duke of Bourbon (1279–1342)
 Louis I of Flanders (1304–1346)
 Louis I of Châtillon (died 1346)
 Louis I of Hungary, Louis I of Poland and Hungary, (1326–1382)
 Louis I of Naples (1339–1384)
 Louis of Valois, Duke of Orléans (1372–1407)
 Louis I, Duke of Bar (died in 1430)
 Louis I, Count of Montpensier (1405–1486)
 Louis I de Bourbon, Prince de Condé (1530–1569)
 Louis I, Cardinal of Guise (1527–1578)
 Louis I of Spain (1707–1724)
 Louis I, Grand Duke of Hesse (1753–1830), previously Louis X, Landgrave of Hesse-Darmstadt
 Ludwig I of Bavaria (1786–1868)
 Luís I of Portugal (1838–1889)
 Louis X of France, also known as Louis I of Navarre (1289–1316)
 Prince Louis of Wales (born 2018), possible future regnal name